The 2012–13 season was Cowdenbeath's first season back in the Scottish First Division, having been promoted from the Scottish Second Division at the end of the 2011–12 season. Cowdenbeath also competed in the Challenge Cup, League Cup and the Scottish Cup.

Summary

Season
Cowdenbeath finished ninth in the Scottish First Division. They reached the Semi-final of the Challenge Cup, the first round of the League Cup and the fourth round of the Scottish Cup.

Results and fixtures

Pre season

Scottish First Division

Scottish Challenge Cup

Scottish League Cup

Scottish Cup

Player statistics

Captains

Squad 
Last updated 7 May 2013

|}

Disciplinary Record
Includes all competitive matches.
Last updated 7 May 2013

Team statistics

League table

Division summary

Transfers

Players in

Players out

References

Cowdenbeath
Cowdenbeath F.C. seasons